Mazelele Airport  is an airport serving the village of Mazelele in Kwango Province, Democratic Republic of the Congo.

See also

Transport in the Democratic Republic of the Congo
List of airports in the Democratic Republic of the Congo

References

External links
 OpenStreetMap - Mazelele Airport
 OurAirports - Mazelele
 FallingRain - Mazelele Airport
 HERE Maps - Mazelele
 

Airports in Kwango